Jennifer L. Ross is an American physicist who is Professor and Chair of the Department of Physics at Syracuse University. Her research considers active biological condensed matter physics. She was elected fellow of the American Physical Society in 2018 and American Association for the Advancement of Science in 2022.

Early life and education 
Ross became interested in science as a young person and spent her childhood playing with a chemistry set. She became interested in physics during her high school years, and eventually studied physics and mathematics at the all-women Wellesley College. She moved to the University of California, Santa Barbara for her graduate studies, where she studied microtubules and taxol. Ross was awarded an National Institutes of Health postdoctoral fellowship at the University of Pennsylvania.

Research and career 
In 2007, Ross joined the faculty at the University of Massachusetts Amherst. She is interested in the physical laws the determine the organization of proteins and organelles inside cells. To study the mechanisms that underpin biological processes, she developed single-molecule imaging to investigate microtubule motor proteins. These proteins are responsible for the movement of materials and organelles through bodily cells. In nerve cells, materials have to be transported over long distances, and defective transport is associated with neuromuscular disease. Ross images these proteins using a super-resolution microscope and fluorescent tagging. She also created an interdisciplinary optics course to train biologists, engineers and chemists in how design, build and use optical microscopes. Together with Margaret Gardel, Ross was awarded a National Science Foundation INSPIRE award to create phase diagrams of biological processes.

Ross investigated the processes that underpin cell division, in particular, the assembly of microtubules into mitotic spindles. The spindles serve to separate chromosomes and make sure all cells contain the same genetic information. Ross was the first to demonstrate that the shapes of the spindles can be described by the same physics that are used to describe liquid crystalline materials. She was named the Chair of the Department of Physics at Syracuse University in 2020.

Awards and honors 
 2005 National Institutes of Health Ruth L. Kirschstein National Research Service Award
 2010 Research Corporation Cottrell Scholar
 2013 Biophysical Society Margaret Oakley Dayhoff Award
 2013 National Science Foundation INSPIRE Award
 2014 Gordon and Betty Moore Foundation Scialog Fellow
 2018 Elected Fellow of the American Physical Society 
 2019 University of Massachusetts Amherst Chancellor's Leadership Fellow
2022  Elected Fellow of the American Association for the Advancement of Science for "distinguished contributions to biophysics, particularly for experimentally elucidating regulatory mechanisms in intracellular transport."

Selected publications

Personal life 
Ross has two children.

References 

Living people
Year of birth missing (living people)
American women physicists
Wellesley College alumni
University of California, Santa Barbara alumni
Syracuse University faculty
Fellows of the American Physical Society
University of Massachusetts Amherst faculty
American women academics
21st-century American women
Fellows of the American Association for the Advancement of Science